Carlo Carrà (February 11, 1881 – April 13, 1966) was an Italian painter and a leading figure of the Futurist movement that flourished in Italy during the beginning of the 20th century. In addition to his many paintings, he wrote a number of books concerning art. He taught for many years in the city of Milan.

Biography
Carrà was born in Quargnento, near Alessandria (Piedmont). At the age of 12 he left home in order to work as a mural decorator.

In 1899–1900, Carrà was in Paris decorating pavilions at the Exposition Universelle, where he became acquainted with contemporary French art. He then spent a few months in London in contact with exiled Italian anarchists, and returned to Milan in 1901. In 1906, he enrolled at Brera Academy (Accademia di Brera) in the city, and studied under Cesare Tallone. In 1910 he signed, along with Umberto Boccioni, Luigi Russolo and Giacomo Balla the Manifesto of Futurist Painters, and began a phase of painting that became his most popular and influential.

Carrà's Futurist phase ended around the time World War I began. His work, while still using some Futurist concepts, began to deal more clearly with form and stillness, rather than motion and feeling. Inspired by Trecento painting, children's art, and the work of Henri Rousseau, Carrà soon began creating still lifes in a simplified style that emphasized the reality of ordinary objects. In 1917 he met Giorgio de Chirico in Ferrara, and worked with him there for several weeks. Influenced by de Chirico, Carrà began including mannequin imagery in his paintings. The two artists were the innovators of a style they called "metaphysical painting". By 1919, Carrà's metaphysical phase was giving way to an archaicism inspired by the works of Giotto, whom he admired as "the artist whose forms are closest to our manner of conceiving the construction of bodies in space." Carrà's painting The Daughters of Lot (1919) exemplifies the new direction of his work. Throughout the 1920s and 1930s, he concentrated mainly on landscape painting and developed a more atmospheric style. An example from this period is his 1928 Morning by the Sea.

He is best known for his 1911 Futurist work, The Funeral of the Anarchist Galli. Carrà was indeed an anarchist as a young man but, along with many other Futurists, later held more reactionary political views, becoming ultranationalist and irredentist before and during the war. He supported fascism after 1918. In the 1930s, Carrà signed a manifesto in which called for support of the state ideology through art. The Strapaese group he joined, founded by Giorgio Morandi, was strongly influenced by fascism and responded to the neo-classical guidelines which had been set by the regime after 1937, but was opposed to the ideological drive towards strong centralism.
 
Carrà died in Milan in 1966.

Selected works
The Funeral of the Anarchist Galli (1911)
The Enchanted Chamber (1917)
The Metaphysical Muse (1917)
The Daughter of the West (1919)
The Engineer's Lover (1921)
Canale a Venezia (1926)

References

Sources
Carrà at the Peggy Guggenheim Collection 
Carrà at the Mart, Museo d'Arte Moderna e Contemporanea di Trento e Rovereto
Mark Antliff, "Fascism, Modernism, and Modernity", in The Art Bulletin, March 2002
Elizabeth Cowling and Jennifer Mundy, On Classic Ground: Picasso, Léger, de Chirico and the New Classicism 1910-1930, London:, Tate Gallery, 1990 
Karen Pinkus, Bodily Regimes: Advertising under Italian Fascism, Minneapolis-Saint Paul, University of Minnesota Press, 1995 
Stanislao G. Pugliese, Italian Fascism and Anti-Fascism: A Critical Anthology, Manchester, Manchester University Press, 2001

External links

Ten Dreams Galleries

 
Italian Futurist painters
Italian fascists
Italian muralists
1881 births
1966 deaths
Art writers
Italian male painters
 
Brera Academy alumni
Academic staff of Brera Academy
People from Quargnento
20th-century Italian painters